Polne may refer to the following places in Poland:

Polne, Lubusz Voivodeship
Polne, West Pomeranian Voivodeship